Castelnuovo Nigra is a comune (municipality) in the Metropolitan City of Turin in the Italian region Piedmont, located about  north of Turin. It is formed by the union of two villages: Sale Castelnuovo and Villa Castelnuovo

References

External links
 Official website

Canavese